Tre Nixon (born January 26, 1998) is an American football wide receiver for the New England Patriots of the National Football League (NFL). He played college football at Ole Miss and UCF.

He was chosen by long time Patriots director of football research Ernie Adams.

Professional career

Nixon was drafted in the seventh round, 242nd overall, of the 2021 NFL Draft by the New England Patriots. On May 11, 2021, Nixon officially signed with the Patriots. Nixon chose to wear 87 making him the first player since Rob Gronkowski to wear the number. He was waived on August 31, 2021 and re-signed to the practice squad. He signed a reserve/future contract with the Patriots on January 17, 2022.

Nixon switched from 87 to 82 for the 2022 season. On August 30, 2022, Nixon was waived by the Patriots and signed to the practice squad the next day. He signed a reserve/future contract on January 10, 2023.

References

External links
New England Patriots bio
UCF Knights bio

Living people
Ole Miss Rebels football players
People from Brevard County, Florida
Players of American football from Florida
UCF Knights football players
New England Patriots players
1998 births
American football wide receivers